Banaras Hindu University Act, also called the BHU Act, formally the Banaras Hindu University Act of 1915 , formerly the Benares Hindu University Act is an act of Indian Parliament, passed on 1 October 1915 and assented by the Viceroy and Governor-General of India on the same day to establish Banaras Hindu University. It was the act number 16 of 1915, and came into force from 1 April 1916 on being published in the Gazette of India on 23 March 1916.

The act has been amended six times thus far, in 1922, 1930, 1951, 1958, 1966, and 1969.

History 
In 1905 at the twenty first conference of Indian National Congress in Banaras Pandit Madan Mohan Malaviya announced his goal of establishing a university in Banaras. Mahamana Malviya established a Hindu University Society, with Maharaja of Darbhanga Rameshwar Singh Bahadur as the president to crowd-source the funding from all over Indian subcontinent for the establishment of such university.

The first draft was prepared in October 1911.

On 22 March 1915, then Education Minister Harcourt Butler introduced the Benares Hindu University Bill.  In his speech he remarked about the university:

The bill was passed on 1 October 1915.

The Act 

The Banaras Hindu University Act, 1915, as modified upto December 2018
The Benares Hindu University Act, as passed in 1915

Statutes 
The Statutes in force at the commencement of the university were added into the BHU act as a schedule vide an amendment in 1966. The statutes of the university are published on the official website, and are not usually added to the Act document.

References 

Banaras Hindu University
Acts of the Parliament of India